Julio Julián Castillo Valdez (June 3, 1956 – July 23, 2022) was a Dominican professional baseball infielder and manager. He played in Major League Baseball (MLB) for the Boston Red Sox from 1980 to 1983, and later managed in Minor League Baseball.

Biography
Valdez began his professional baseball career in 1976 with the Winter Haven Red Sox, a farm team of the Boston Red Sox; he reached the Triple-A level in 1979. Valdez went on to play in MLB for parts of four seasons (1980–1983) with Boston, mainly as a shortstop. In 65 MLB games with Red Sox, Valdez hit .207 (18-for-87) with one home run and eight RBIs. In 1981, while with the Triple-A Pawtucket Red Sox, he played in the longest professional baseball game in history, batting 2-for-13 in the 33-inning contest.

On May 6, 1983, Valdez was arrested at Fenway Park by members of the Boston Police Department during a game against the Seattle Mariners. Valdez had not played for the team since the end of April, and was not in uniform when arrested. Charged with statutory rape, it was subsequently reported that the minor involved had lied to Valdez about her age. The charges were dismissed in July of that year, after a grand jury refused to return an indictment.

Following his arrest, Valdez was suspended with pay by the Red Sox and later designated for assignment. He did not play in another major league game. He played in Minor League Baseball for the Red Sox organization though 1984, and then for the Chicago Cubs organization through 1988.

After his playing career, Valdez managed the Dominican Summer League teams for several MLB franchises, including the Cubs, New York Yankees, and Chicago White Sox.

See also
List of Major League Baseball players from the Dominican Republic

References

External links

1956 births
2022 deaths
Boston Red Sox players
People from San Cristóbal, Dominican Republic
Dominican Republic expatriate baseball players in the United States
Major League Baseball players from the Dominican Republic
Major League Baseball shortstops
Minor league baseball managers
Bristol Red Sox players
Iowa Cubs players
New Britain Red Sox players
Pawtucket Red Sox players
Pittsfield Cubs players
Winston-Salem Red Sox players
Winston-Salem Spirits players
Winter Haven Red Sox players